The Utukok River (Iñupiaq: Utuqqaq) is a  long stream in the North Slope Borough of the U.S. state of Alaska. It rises in the De Long Mountains at the confluence of Kogruk and Tupik creeks and flows north, northeast, and then northwest. It is the breeding ground for Arctic Caribou and various birds.

Utuqqaq, meaning old or ancient, is the Inuit name for Icy Cape. Variant names used for the river in the 19th century included "Utukak" and "Ootokok".

See also
List of rivers of Alaska

References

Rivers of North Slope Borough, Alaska
Rivers of Alaska
Drainage basins of the Chukchi Sea